Carter Frederick Ham (born February 16, 1952) is a retired United States Army general who served as the second commander of United States Africa Command. As commander of Africa Command, he led Operation Odyssey Dawn, the initial United States role in the 2011 military intervention in Libya.

Ham served as the commanding general of the United States Army Europe and Seventh Army from August 28, 2008, to March 8, 2011. Prior to that, he served as Director for Operations (J-3) at the Joint Staff from August 2007 to August 2008 and the commanding general, 1st Infantry Division from August 2006 to August 2007, and was the commander of Operation Able Sentry in Macedonia in the mid-1990s, during the Yugoslav wars. 

Post-retirement, Ham served as president and CEO of the Association of the United States Army from July 2016 to September 2021.

Early life and education
Ham was born on February 16, 1952, in Portland, Oregon. He attended high school at Charles F. Brush High School in Lyndhurst, Ohio, a suburb of Cleveland. He received the rank of Eagle Scout as a youth in 1965. Ham is a 1976 Distinguished Military Graduate of John Carroll University in the Cleveland suburb of University Heights, Ohio. During his military career, he achieved a Masters of Arts degree in National Security and Strategic Studies from the Naval War College, in Newport, Rhode Island. In 2012, his final full year as a U.S. Army officer, the Boy Scouts of America bestowed upon him the Distinguished Eagle Scout Award.

Military career

Ham enlisted in the United States Army in 1973 and served as an infantryman in the 82nd Airborne Division before being accepted in the Army Reserve Officers' Training Corps (Army ROTC) while attending John Carroll University in Cleveland, Ohio. An ROTC Distinguished Military Graduate, Ham was commissioned as an infantry officer in 1976. He later received his master's degree in National Security and Strategic Studies from the Naval War College in Newport, Rhode Island, as well as graduating from several military schools including the Infantry Officer Basic Course, the Armor Officer Advanced Course, the Naval War College's College of Naval Command and Staff, and the Air War College. He is a member of the John Carroll University ROTC Hall of Fame. He and his wife, Christi, are both John Carroll University graduates.

Ham's early assignments included service at Fort Knox, Kentucky, and tours of duty in Italy and Germany. After graduating from the Armor Officer Advanced Course, he was a Recruiting Area Commander in Lima, Ohio. In 1984, he served with a joint service unit in support of the Olympic Games in Los Angeles.

From 1984 until 1989, Ham served as Assistant Inspector General, then as Battalion Operations Officer (S-3) and Executive Officer with the Opposing Force (OPFOR) at the National Training Center, Fort Irwin, California. He attended the College of Naval Command and Staff, graduating with distinction in 1990, and was then assigned to the U.S. Army Infantry School at Fort Benning, Georgia.

Ham served a tour as an advisor with a Saudi Arabian National Guard Brigade in Riyadh as part of OPM-SANG then returned to Fort Benning, where he was the executive officer for the Infantry School. Ham commanded the 1st Battalion, 6th Infantry in Vilseck, Germany including a six-month tour with the United Nations Protection Forces in the Republic of Macedonia. Following battalion command, he was the Senior Observer/Controller of the Timberwolf Team at the Combat Maneuver Training Center, Hohenfels, Germany.

Ham graduated from the Air War College in 1997 then returned to Germany, where he served as Operations Officer (G-3), then Chief of Staff, 1st Infantry Division. From 1999 to 2001 he commanded the 29th Infantry Regiment at Fort Benning, then served as Deputy Director for Resources and Analysis (J-8) for United States Central Command at MacDill AFB in Tampa, Florida and in Doha, Qatar, during which time he was selected for promotion to brigadier general. Ham was assigned as the deputy commanding general for training and readiness, I Corps at Fort Lewis, Washington in August 2003. In January 2004, he assumed command of Multinational Brigade (Task Force Olympia) – North in Mosul, Iraq serving there until February 2005. During his time in Afghanistan, Ham suffered from post-traumatic stress disorder, which was caused by his attending the aftermath of a deadly suicide bombing at a mess hall. He later sought treatment for his condition and publicly encouraged other soldiers to do the same.

Returning from Iraq, Ham served as the deputy director for regional operations, J-3, on The Joint Staff. Ham assumed command of the 1st Infantry Division at Fort Riley, Kansas, in August 2006 and served as the commanding general until July 2007, returning to The Joint Staff as director for operations, J-3. On August 28, 2008, Ham became the 34th COMMANDER of the United States Army Europe headquartered at Campbell Barracks, Heidelberg, Germany. In 2010, Ham served as co-chair for the comprehensive review of issues associated with the repeal of the "Don't ask, don't tell" policy.

The United States Senate, confirmed Ham's nomination to become the next Commander of United States Africa Command, headquartered at Kelley Barracks, Stuttgart, Germany, in November 2010. He assumed the post on March 8, 2011.

Ham was in command of United States forces enforcing the Libyan no-fly zone, along with Admiral Samuel J. Locklear. Described as "in charge of the coalition effort", Ham on March 21, 2011, said, "there would be coalition airstrikes on Colonel Qaddafi's mobile air defenses and that some 80 sorties – only half of them by the United States – had been flown on Monday." Admiral Locklear, aboard the flagship Mount Whitney, had tactical command of the Operation Odyssey Dawn joint taskforce. Ham also said he had "full authority to attack the regime's forces if they refused to comply with President Barack Obama's demands that they pull back from Ajdabiya, Misrata and Zawiya," according to one report. Earlier, he said that the United States was not working with the Libyan rebels. "Our mission is not to support any opposition forces," Ham said by video feed to the Pentagon from his headquarters in Stuttgart.

Ham was in overall command of military forces when the September 11, 2012, terrorist attacks were launched on the American consulate and CIA annex in Benghazi, Libya.  According to his June 2013 Congressional testimony, Ham chose not to deploy close air support during the attack, based on a lack of situational awareness about the circumstances on the ground.  He denied the allegation by some Republicans that President Barack Obama or others in Obama's administration had ordered him to "stand down" a planned rescue mission that was ready to deploy.

After a 24-month tour of duty as Commander Africa Command, Ham was succeeded by General David M. Rodriguez. General Ham retired in June 2013.

Views
Ham was quoted in an online Washington Post article by Greg Miller and Craig Whitlock, posted on October 1, 2012, that, as saying, that, as a result of al-Qaeda in the Islamic Maghreb's overtaking and capturing more territory in Mali in Africa, and possessing arms from Libya after the Libyan Civil War which overthrew Muammar Gaddafi, there is the possibility of the U.S. assisting, but not leading, counterterrorism operations done by other countries. A more radical step would be the use of drones.

While speaking about the Chinese presence that was "everywhere" in Africa, Ham expressed an appreciation for the economic competition between China and the U.S. in Africa, observing that China was "very good at infrastructure development – roads, bridges, airports, government buildings and the like – constructed by the Chinese in – which greatly benefits the African people."

Post-retirement

In 2015, Ham was elected chairman of the National Commission on the Future of the Army, an eight-member panel tasked with making recommendations on the size, force structure and capabilities of the Army. The committee was disbanded soon after publishing its findings on January 28, 2016. 

Ham became an executive vice president of the Association of the United States Army (AUSA) in February 2016. He succeeded Gordon R. Sullivan as President and CEO of AUSA on July 1, 2016. He relinquished the presidency to Robert Brooks Brown on September 30, 2021.

Dates of rank

Note:* The O-1, etc. designates the pay grade.

Major duty assignments

Decorations and badges

References

External links

1952 births
Living people
Military personnel from Portland, Oregon
United States Army personnel of the Iraq War
John Carroll University alumni
Naval War College alumni
People of the First Libyan Civil War
Recipients of the Defense Superior Service Medal
Recipients of the Distinguished Service Medal (US Army)
Recipients of the Legion of Merit
Recipients of the Polish Army Medal
United States Army generals
Knights Commander of the Order of Merit of the Federal Republic of Germany
United States Army personnel of the Gulf War